Vyshmanovo is a rural locality (a village) in Aserkhovskoye Rural Settlement, Sobinsky District, Vladimir Oblast, Russia. The population was 372 as of 2010. There are 10 streets.

Geography 
Vyshmanovo is located 14 km east of Sobinka (the district's administrative centre) by road. Zaprudye is the nearest rural locality.

References 

Rural localities in Sobinsky District